Maria Antônia Gigliotti Campos Maya (born 29 June 1981 in Rio de Janeiro) is a Brazilian actress.

Biography and career 

She is the daughter of director Wolf Maya and also an actress and director Cininha de Paula, grand-niece of comedian Chico Anysio, granddaughter of Lupe Gigliotti, second cousin of comedian and actor Nizo Neto, Marcos Palmeira and Bruno Mazzeo.

Maria started in the telenovela Cara e Coroa in 1995, where he played Nádia. This was followed by Kelly Bola one of its greatest figures in Salsa e Merengue in 1996. After the novel only came back to the novels in 2003; at the time married to actor Ernani Moraes, 25 years older than she, who is separated.

At this time three did miniseries: Hilda Furacão, A Muralha and O Quinto dos Infernos. His back was in the novels Chocolate com Pimenta where did the hypochondriac Lili, doctor's secretary Paul (played by Guilherme Piva). After he made his most prominent characters, Regininha, a lush samba Senhora do Destino, 2004. In 2006 he Sandrinha in Cobras & Lagartos.

In India – A Love Story played Inês, a girl who wore weird clothes and makeup and tried to warn his parents Melissa and Ramiro, played by Christiane Torloni and Humberto Martins, about the illness of his brother, Tarso (Bruno Gagliasso). Grandfather also helped to uncover some family secrets.

In 2009, he made a cameo appearance in Tempos de Paz, of Daniel Filho. In the same year and the following year starred in two parts, Play and A Loba de Ray-ban, in which she plays Fernanda Porto, who falls for Júlia Ferraz (Christiane Torloni).

In 2011, the novel is Aquele Beijo. In 2013 returns to the novels Amor à Vida, the plot she plays the Bolivian Alejandra.

Filmography

Television

Film

Theater

References

External links 

1981 births
Living people
Actresses from Rio de Janeiro (city)
Brazilian television actresses
Brazilian telenovela actresses
Brazilian film actresses
21st-century Brazilian actresses
Brazilian LGBT musicians
Bisexual actresses